The Patteriol is a mountain in the Verwall Alps in the Austrian state of Tyrol. (In old literature the elevation is stated higher: . Patteriol is sometimes called "Matterhorn of Verwall" because of its shape.

Aside from the main summit, the Patteriol has some more summits:
 South summit (also called Pfeilerkopf, 2,884 m)
 Horn (3,003 m)
 Kleiner Patteriol (2,590 m)

Ascents 

The ascent on normal route from the alpine club hut Konstanzer Hütte at 1688 m to the summit takes approximately 4½ to 5 hours and difficulty grade is II on UIAA climbing scale. The first ascensionists of the summit were around the year 1860 two geodesists, three hunters and a soldier (a "Kaiserjäger").

Additionally there are rock climbing routes. Some of them are:
 North-east ridge, UIAA grade mostly III, two spots IV− and V
 East pillar, grade IV+
 South pillar, grade IV+

References 

Mountains of Tyrol (state)
Mountains of the Alps
Verwall Alps
Alpine three-thousanders